Capoeta, also known as scrapers, is a genus of fish in the family Cyprinidae found in Western Asia. The distribution extends from Turkey to the Levant, to Transcaucasia, Iraq, Turkmenistan, in Armenia, particularly in lake Sevan and northern Afghanistan. This genus is most closely related to Luciobarbus and in itself is divided into three morphologically, biogeographically and genetically distinct groups or clades: the Mesopotamian clade, the Anatolian-Iranian clade and the Aralo-Caspian clade.

Species
There are currently 35 recognized species in this genus:
 Capoeta aculeata (Valenciennes, 1844)
 Capoeta alborzensis Jouladeh-Roudbar, Eagderi, Ghanavi & Doadrio, 2016
 Capoeta anamisensis Zareian, Esmaeili & Freyhof, 2016
 Capoeta angorae (Hankó (hu), 1925) (Ankara barb)
 Capoeta antalyensis (Battalgil, 1944) (Pamphylian scraper, Antalya barb) 
 Capoeta baliki Turan, Kottelat, Ekmekçi & İmamoğlu, 2006 (fourbarbel scraper, Sakarya barb)
 Capoeta banarescui Turan, Kottelat, Ekmekçi & İmamoğlu, 2006 (Colchic scraper, Banarescu's barb)
 Capoeta barroisi Lortet, 1894 (Orontes scraper, Tigris barb)
 Capoeta bergamae M. S. Karaman (sr), 1969 (Aegean scraper)
 Capoeta buhsei Kessler, 1877 (Namak scraper)
 Capoeta caelestis Schöter, Özuluğ & Freyhof, 2009 (Taurus scraper)
 Capoeta capoetoides Pellegrin, 1938 
 Capoeta capoeta (Güldenstädt, 1773) (Caucasian scraper)
 Capoeta coadi Alwan, Zareian & Esmaeili, 2016
 Capoeta damascina (Valenciennes, 1842) (Levantine scraper, Mesopotamian barb)
 Capoeta ekmekciae Turan, Kottelat, Kırankaya & Engin, 2006 (Grusinian scraper)
 Capoeta erhani Turan, Kottelat & Ekmekçi, 2008 (Ceyhan scraper)
 Capoeta ferdowsii Jouladeh-Roudbar, Eagderi, Murillo-Ramos, Ghanavi & Doadrio, 2017
 Capoeta fusca A. M. Nikolskii, 1897
 Capoeta gracilis (Keyserling, 1861) 
Capoeta kaput  Levin, Prokofiev & Roubenyan 2019
 Capoeta kosswigi M. S. Karaman (sr), 1969 (Van scraper, Van barb)
 Capoeta mandica Bianco & Bănărescu, 1982 
 Capoeta mauricii Küçük, Turan, Şahin & Gülle, 2009 (longsnout scraper)
 Capoeta pestai (Pietschmann, 1933) (Eğirdir longsnout scraper, Eğirdir barb)
 Capoeta pyragyi Jouladeh-Roudbar, Eagderi, Murillo-Ramos, Ghanavi & Doadrio, 2017
 Capoeta razii Jouladeh-Roudbar, Eagderi, Ghanavi & Doadrio, 2017
 Capoeta saadii (Heckel, 1847) 
 Capoeta sevangi De Filippi, 1865
 Capoeta shajariani Jouladeh-Roudbar, Eagderi, Murillo-Ramos, Ghanavi & Doadrio, 2017
 Capoeta sieboldii (Steindachner, 1864) (nipple-lip scraper)
 Capoeta tinca (Heckel, 1843) (western fourbarbel scraper, Anatolian khramulya)
 Capoeta trutta (Heckel, 1843) (longspine scraper)
 Capoeta turani Özuluğ & Freyhof, 2008 (Seyhan scraper)
 Capoeta umbla (Heckel, 1843) (Tigris scraper)

References

 
Freshwater fish genera
Taxa named by Achille Valenciennes
Taxonomy articles created by Polbot